Arpunk is a village in the Vardenis Municipality of the Gegharkunik Province of Armenia. Three kilometers southeast of the village is a 15th-century church. The village was populated by Azerbaijanis before the exodus of Azerbaijanis from Armenia after the outbreak of the Nagorno-Karabakh conflict. In 1988-1989 Armenian refugees from Azerbaijan settled in the village.

Toponymy 
The village was known as Bahar until 1978.

Notable people 
Aladdin Allahverdiyev (born 1947), Soviet, Russian and Azerbaijani scientist, professor (2001)

References

External links 
 
 

Populated places in Gegharkunik Province